Ángel Moreno Morcillo (born 2 December 1997) is a Spanish footballer who plays as either a central defender or a left back for Alcalá.

Club career
Moreno was born in La Roda, Albacete, Castile-La Mancha, and was a La Roda CF youth graduate. On 1 February 2015, while still a youth, he made his first team debut by coming on as a half-time substitute in a 1–3 Segunda División B away loss against Real Betis B.

In July 2015 Moreno moved to Albacete Balompié, returning to youth football. He was promoted to the reserves in the Tercera División the following year, but made his first-team debut on 21 August 2016 by replacing Carlos Delgado in a 3–0 home win against Zamudio SD in the third division.

Moreno scored his first senior goal on 1 October 2016, netting the equalizer for the B-side in a 3–3 away draw against CD Azuqueca; late into the month, he extended his contract until 2020. The following march, he suffered a knee injury, and remained sidelined for seven months.

Moreno made his professional debut on 25 February 2018, again replacing Delgado in a 1–0 home win against CD Numancia in the Segunda División. The following 25 January, after being an ever-present figure in the B-side, he renewed his contract until 2021.

On 19 July 2019, Moreno was loaned to freshly relegated side Córdoba CF for one year. The following 31 January, after being rarely used, he moved to fellow third division side Cultural y Deportiva Leonesa also in a temporary deal.

On 24 September 2020, Moreno terminated his contract with Albacete, and signed for fourth division side CD Quintanar del Rey exactly one month later.

On 14 January 2021, Moreno leaves CD Quintanar del Rey to file in the winter market for CP Villarrobledo, signed for fourth division.

On 27 July 2021, After a season finale in CP Villarrobledo. Moreno signs for UD Socuellamos.

References

External links

1997 births
Living people
Sportspeople from the Province of Albacete
Spanish footballers
Footballers from Castilla–La Mancha
Association football defenders
Segunda División players
Segunda División B players
Tercera División players
La Roda CF players
Atlético Albacete players
Albacete Balompié players
Córdoba CF players
Cultural Leonesa footballers